Fritillaria michailovskyi is a species of flowering plant in the lily family Liliaceae, native to mountainous areas of northeastern Turkey.

In cultivation, it requires very well-drained conditions, as it does not tolerate winter wet.

References

michailovskyi